Tiran (also Romanized as Tīrān) is a village in Barzanun Rural District, Sarvelayat District, Nishapur County, Razavi Khorasan Province, Iran. At the 2006 census, its population was 493, in 118 families.

References 

Populated places in Nishapur County